The wealth effect is the change in spending that accompanies a change in perceived wealth.
Usually the wealth effect is positive: spending changes in the same direction as perceived wealth.

Effect on individuals
Changes in a consumer's wealth cause changes in the amounts and distribution of his or her consumption. People typically spend more overall when one of two things is true: when people actually are richer, objectively, or when people perceive themselves to be richer—for example, the assessed value of their home increases, or a stock they own goes up in price.

Demand for some goods (called inferior goods) decreases with increasing wealth.  For example, consider consumption of cheap fast food versus steak.  As someone becomes wealthier, their demand for cheap fast food is likely to decrease, and their demand for more expensive steak may increase.

Consumption may be tied to relative wealth.  Particularly when supply is highly inelastic, or when the seller is a monopoly, one's ability to purchase a good may be highly related to one's relative wealth in the economy.  Consider for example
the cost of real estate in a city with high average wealth (for example New York or London), in comparison to a city
with a low average wealth.  Supply is fairly inelastic, so if a helicopter drop (or gold rush) were to suddenly
create large amounts of wealth in the low wealth city, those who did not receive this new wealth would rapidly find
themselves crowded out of such markets, and materially worse off in terms of their ability to consume/purchase real estate
(despite having participated in a weak Pareto improvement).  In such situations, one cannot dismiss the relative effect of
wealth on demand and supply, and cannot assume that these are static (see also General equilibrium).

However, according to David Backus the wealth effect is not observable in economic data, at least in regard to increases or decreases in home or stock equity. For example, while the stock market boom in the late 1990s (caused by the dot-com bubble) increased the wealth of Americans, it did not produce a significant change in consumption, and after the crash, consumption did not decrease.

Economist Dean Baker disagrees and says that “housing wealth effect” is well-known and is a standard part of economic theory and modeling, and that economists expect households to consume based on their wealth. He cites approvingly research done by Carroll and Zhou that estimates that households increase their annual consumption by 6 cents for every additional dollar of home equity.

In macroeconomics

In macroeconomics, a rise in real wealth increases consumption, shifting the IS curve out to the right, thus pushing up interest rates and increasing aggregate demand. A decrease in real wealth does the opposite.

See also
 Income effect
 Income elasticity of demand
 Money illusion
 Ricardian equivalence
 Wealth (economics)
 Wealth elasticity of demand

References

Wealth
Economics effects